Amos Andre Dodson (April 10, 1856 – December 26, 1888) was an American teacher, Republican Party organizer, public official, and state legislator in Virginia. He represented Mecklenburg County in the Virginia House of Delegates. He was a Republican.

He studied law under the tutelage of Alfred William Harris. Dodson eventually moved to Tennessee.

Before he died he married Sylvia J. Mason.

References

1856 births
1888 deaths
People from Mecklenburg County, Virginia
Republican Party members of the Virginia House of Delegates
19th-century American politicians